The year 1994 is the 2nd year in the history of the Ultimate Fighting Championship (UFC), a mixed martial arts promotion based in the United States. In 1994 the UFC held 3 events beginning with, UFC 2.

Debut UFC fighters

The following fighters fought their first UFC fight in 1994:

Alberto Cerro Leon
Anthony Macias
Christophe Leininger
Dan Severn
David Levicki
Eldo Dias Xavier
Emmanuel Yarborough
Felix Mitchell
Frank Hamaker
Fred Ettish
Guy Mezger

Harold Howard
Jason Fairn
Joe Charles
Joe Son
Johnny Rhodes
Keith Hackney
Kimo Leopoldo
Marcus Bossett
Melton Bowen
Minoki Ichihara
Orlando Wiet

Ray Wizard
Remco Pardoel
Robert Lucarelli
Roland Payne
Ron van Clief
Scott Baker
Scott Morris
Sean Daugherty
Steve Jennum
Thaddeus Luster

Events list

See also
 UFC
 List of UFC champions
 List of UFC events

References

Ultimate Fighting Championship by year
1994 in mixed martial arts